Halicylindramides are antifungal peptides isolated from Halichondria.

Notes
Halicylindramides D and E, antifungal peptides from the marine sponge Halichondria cylindrata

Antifungals
Cyclic peptides